The 2021 Men's EuroHockey Championship II was the ninth edition of the Men's EuroHockey Championship II, the second level of the men's European field hockey championships organized by the European Hockey Federation. It was held from 15 to 21 August 2021 in Gniezno, Poland.

The top five teams qualified for the European qualifier for the 2023 Men's FIH Hockey World Cup.

Austria won their first EuroHockey Championship II title by defeating Scotland 7–6 in the shoot-out following a 1–1 draw in regular time. Ireland won the bronze medal by defeating the hosts Poland 4–2.

Qualified teams
Participating nations have qualified based on their final ranking from the 2019 competition.

Umpires
The following 10 umpires were appointed for the tournament by the EHF:

Preliminary round

Pool A

Pool B

Fifth to eighth place classification

Pool C
The points obtained in the preliminary round against the other team are taken over.

First to fourth place classification

Bracket

Semi-finals

Third place game

Final

Statistics

Final standings

Goalscorers

See also
2021 Men's EuroHockey Championship III
2021 Men's EuroHockey Nations Championship
2021 Women's EuroHockey Championship II

References

EuroHockey Championship II
Men 2
International field hockey competitions hosted by Poland
EuroHockey Championship II
EuroHockey Championship II
Sport in Greater Poland Voivodeship
Gniezno